Richard Anthony, born Ricardo Anthony Btesh (13 January 1938 – 19 April 2015), was a French pop singer, born in Egypt, who had his greatest success in the 1960s and 1970s.

Life and career
He was born in Cairo, Egypt, to a family of prominent industrialists and diplomats.  As a child he lived in Egypt and Argentina, as well as studying at Brighton College in England.  From 1951, he studied at Lycée Janson-de-Sailly and settled in Paris.   He started studying law, but after his father's sudden death in 1956 became a door-to-door salesman to help support his family.  He also began playing saxophone in Paris nightclubs.

In 1958, as Richard Anthony, he made his first recordings as a singer, initially recording French language versions of American pop hits.  These included "Tu m'étais destinée" ("You Are My Destiny"), "Peggy Sue", and "Nouvelle vague" ("Three Cool Cats") which became successful in France. In the early 1960s he became one of the biggest French pop stars, with other hits including "Let's Twist Again", "C’est ma fête" ("It's My Party"), and "Et j'entends siffler le train" ("500 Miles"). He started recording at the Abbey Road Studios in England, and reached the British charts with the English-language songs "Walking Alone" (#37, 1963) and "If I Loved You" (#18, 1964). One of his songs, "I Don't Know What To Do", arranged by Ivor Raymonde, was released in the US in 1965 by Motown Records on the V.I.P. label, making Anthony the first European artist to appear for that company.

He recorded the Rolling Stones' "Ruby Tuesday" as "Fille sauvage" in 1966, and his song "Aranjuez mon amour", based on Joaquín Rodrigo's Concierto de Aranjuez, became one of his biggest international hits in 1967.  He remained popular in France, having one of his biggest hits in 1974 with "Amoureux de ma femme", which was a cover version of an Italian song originally by Caterina Caselli . Most of his recordings are cover versions in French. In the late 1970s, he remarried and moved to Los Angeles for several years.  After returning to France in 1982, he continued to record, perform, and appear on TV shows, and in 1998 published an autobiography, Il faut croire aux étoiles. Over his career, his total record sales were estimated to be at least 60 million.

He died in 2015, aged 77.

Discography

 Tu m’étais destinée (1958)  –  You Are My Destiny
Peggy Sue (1958)  –  Peggy Sue
Suzie Darling (1958)
La do da da (1958)
Nouvelle vague (1959) – Three Cool Cats
Jéricho (1959) – Joshua Fit' the Battle
Tu parles trop (1960) – You Talk Too Much
Clémentine (1960)  – Clementine
Itsy bitsy petit bikini (1960)  –  Itsy Bitsy Teenie Weenie Yellow Polka Dot Bikini
Dis-lui que je l’aime (1961)
Écoute dans le vent (1961)  –  Blowin' in the Wind, Bob Dylan
Ça tourne rond (1961) – African Waltz
Let's twist again (1961)  –  Let's Twist Again
Fiche le camp, Jack (1961)  –  Hit the Road Jack
Noël (1961)
Tu peux la prendre (1961 ou 1962) – You Can Have Her
Leçon de twist (1962)
Délivre-moi (1962) – Unchain My Heart
J’entends siffler le train (1962)  –  Five Hundred Miles – This sold over one million copies, and was awarded a gold disc by the RIAA.
Ne boude pas (1962) - Take Five
Faits pour s’aimer (1962) - Desafinado
On twiste sur le locomotion (1963)  –  The Loco-Motion
En écoutant la pluie (1963) – Rhythm of the Rain
C’est ma fête (1963)  –  It's My Party
Tchin tchin (1963)
Donne-moi ma chance (1963) – Too Late To Worry
Ce Monde (1964)  –  You're My World / Il mio mondo
À présent tu peux t’en aller (1964)  –  I Only Want to Be with You
À toi de choisir (1964)  –  Swinging on a Star
La Corde au cou (1965) – I Should Have Known Better
Je me suis souvent demandé (1965)
Au revoir mon amour (1965) – Goodbye My Love
Jamais je ne vivrai sans toi (1965)  –  You Don't Have to Say You Love Me
The night (La nuit) (1965), by Salvatore Adamo
Hello Pussycat (1966)  –  What's New Pussycat?
La Terre promise (1966)  –  California Dreaming
Sunny (1966)  –  Sunny
Aranjuez, mon Amour (1967) inspired by Concierto de Aranjuez by Joaquín Rodrigo
Le Grand Meaulnes (1967)  –  Le Grand Meaulnes, song inspired by a novel by the French author Alain-Fournier
Inch'Allah (1967) in Arabic, by Salvatore Adamo
Un homme en enfer (1968)
L’Été (1968)
Les Ballons (1968) – Little Arrows
Le Sirop Typhon (1969)  –  Lily the Pink
Les Petits Cochons (1969)
L’An 2005 (1969) – In the Year 2525
Bien l’bonjour (1970)
Na na hé hé espoir (1970) – Na Na Hey Hey Kiss Him Goodbye
Il pleut des larmes (1970) – La Nave del Olvido
Non stop (1977) – Don't Stop
New York (1978)
Señora la dueña (1970) – Lady D'Arbanville
San Diego (1970)
Et après (1971) by Salvatore Adamo
Un soleil rouge (1971)
Tibo (1971)
Maggy May (1971)  –  Maggie May
Sans toi (1972) – Without You
Victoire je t’aime (1973)
Marie-Jeanne (1973)
Amoureux de ma femme (1974) – Nessuno mi può giudicare by Caterina Caselli
Nathalie (1975)
Chanson de dix sous (1975) – I Can't Stay Mad at You
De la musique républicaine (1976)
Voilà pourquoi je l’aime (1976)
À l’aube du dernier jour (1977)
Minuit (1980) – MemOry
Los Angeles (1981)
Elle m’attend (1983)
T'aimer d’amour (1985)
Barrière des générations (1990)
Le rap pas innocent – Ronymix 98 (1998)
Et je m'en vais  –  Then I Kissed Her
Autant chercher à retenir le vent (1965)  –  Catch the Wind
Je n'ai que toi  –  All by Myself
Le soleil ne brille plus (1966)   –  The Sun Ain't Gonna Shine Anymore
J'irai pleurer sous la pluie  –  Crying in the Rain
Après toi  –  The Next Time
Un papillon qui vole (1966)  –  Elusive Butterfly

See also

List of French singers
French popular music
Music of France

References

External links

1938 births
2015 deaths
Egyptian Jews
20th-century Egyptian male singers
Egyptian emigrants to France
Singers from Cairo
Lycée Janson-de-Sailly alumni
Pathé-Marconi artists
Rock and roll musicians
20th-century French male singers